Amblyptilia zhdankoi is a moth of the family Pterophoridae. It is found in Kazakhstan.

References

Moths described in 2001
Amblyptilia